Nunzio Malasomma (4 February 1894 – 12 January 1974) was an Italian film director and screenwriter. He directed 41 films between 1923 and 1968.

Selected filmography

Red Love (1921)
 Mister Radio (1924)
 Orient (1924)
 The Doll Queen (1925)
 One Minute to Twelve (1925)
 The King and the Girl (1925)
 Hunted People (1926)
 Struggle for the Matterhorn (1928)
 The Call of the North (1929)
 The Son of the White Mountain (1930)
 The Man with the Claw (1931)
 The Opera Singer (1932)
 The Telephone Operator (1932)
 The Blind Woman of Sorrento (1934)
 Territorial Militia (1935)
 I Don't Know You Anymore (1936)
 The Two Sergeants (1936)
 Red Orchids (1938)
 The Night of Decision (1938)
The Secret Lie (1938)
 Woman Without a Past (1939)
 Then We'll Get a Divorce (1940)
 Scampolo (1941)
 Torrents of Spring (1942)
 The White Devil (1947)
 The Devil in the Convent (1950)
 Four Red Roses (1951)

References

External links
 

1894 births
1974 deaths
Italian film directors
20th-century Italian screenwriters
Italian male screenwriters
German-language film directors
20th-century Italian male writers